The Statue of André Bessette is an outdoor bronze sculpture in Place du frère Andre, Montreal, Quebec, Canada. The monument is of André Bessette, more commonly known as Brother André, and since his canonization as Saint André. The statue was created by Canadian sculptor Émile Brunet. It was inaugurated on November 2, 1986, in the presence of Mayor Jean Drapeau.

References

External links

 

Bronze sculptures in Canada
Cultural depictions of activists
Cultural depictions of Canadian men
Cultural depictions of religious leaders
Downtown Montreal
Monuments and memorials in Montreal
Outdoor sculptures in Montreal
Sculptures of men in Canada
Statues in Canada
Statues of religious leaders
Statues of activists